Riders of the Black Hills is a 1938 American Western "Three Mesquiteers" B-movie directed by George Sherman and starring Robert Livingston, Ray Corrigan, and Max Terhune.

Cast
 Robert Livingston as Stony Brooke
 Ray Corrigan as Tucson Smith
 Max Terhune as Lullaby Joslin
 Ann Evers as Joyce Garth
 Roscoe Ates as Sheriff Brown (as Rosco Ates)
 Maude Eburne as Mrs. Peggy Garth
 Frank Melton as Don Weston
 Johnny Lang Fitzgerald as Jockey Buck
 Jack Ingram as Henchman Lefty
 John P. Wade as Ed Harvey, Horse Trader
 Edward Earle as Race Track Steward
 Monte Montague as Deputy Sam

References

External links

1938 films
1938 Western (genre) films
American Western (genre) films
1930s English-language films
American black-and-white films
Films directed by George Sherman
Republic Pictures films
Three Mesquiteers films
1930s American films